Lieutenant General (abbreviated as Lt. Gen. and in contraction simply known as 'general') is a senior rank in the Bangladesh Army. It is the second-highest active rank of the Bangladesh Army and was created as a direct equivalent of the British military rank of lieutenant general. It is also considered a 3 star rank. Till 2007 it was the highest rank in the Bangladesh Armed Forces as all chiefs of army staff held this rank and navy and air chiefs were of two-star ranks.

Lieutenant general is a higher rank than Major General, but lower than General. Lieutenant general is the equivalent of vice admiral in the Bangladesh Navy and air marshal in the Bangladesh Air Force. Ziaur Rahman was the first person to hold this rank as prior to him first army chief K M Shafiullah was Major-General and M. A. G. Osmani (retired as a Colonel from the Pakistan Army in 1967) was made full general on the basis of his service for the liberation war in 1972.

Insignia 
The insignia for the rank of lieutenant general is the shapla (water lily) taken from the Bangladesh coat of arms, above a pip and ‘crossed sword and baton’ since 2013; till 2013 the insignia was used for ‘full general’ rank and lieutenant-general's insignia was only shapla over crossed sword and baton. Lieutenant Generals wear three-star pointed badge in collars.

See also
Ranks of Bangladesh Army
List of serving generals of the Bangladesh Army

References 

Military ranks of Bangladesh
 Bangladesh